Outside the Law may refer to:
 Outside the Law (1920 film), a 1920 American crime film by Tod Browning
 Outside the Law (1930 film), a remake of the 1920 film, also by Tod Browning
 Outside the Law (1937 film), an Argentine thriller film
 Outside the Law (1956 film), an American film noir crime film
 Outside the Law (2002 film), an American direct-to-video action film
 Outside the Law (2009 film), a documentary by Polly Nash and Andy Worthington
 Outside the Law (2010 film), a French dramatic film by Rachid Bouchareb

See also
 Above the Law (disambiguation)
 Beyond the Law (disambiguation)